The Writer and the World: Essays (2002) is a collection of essays and reportage, many previously published, spanning the 50-year career of Trinidad-born British writer V. S. Naipaul. The book contains some of Naipaul's most notable essays on post-colonial India, Trinidad, and Zaire. Originally published in the United States by Knopf, it was issued in paperback by Vintage in 2003. The book is edited and introduced by Pankaj Mishra.

External links
Michiko Kakutani, "Books of the Times; An Opinionated Traveler Drawn to the Developing World" (book review), in The New York Times, 13 August 2002
Daphne Merkin, "Suffering, Elemental as Night" (book review), in The New York Times Book Review, 1 September 2002
 Algis Valiunas, "Bleak House" (book review) in The Weekly Standard, 5 August 2002

2002 non-fiction books
Books by V. S. Naipaul
Essay collections
Postcolonial literature
Alfred A. Knopf books